If You See Her is the fifth studio album by American country music duo Brooks & Dunn, released in 1998 on Arista Nashville. The album featured five chart singles: "If You See Him/If You See Her", "How Long Gone", and "Husbands and Wives" (a cover of a Roger Miller song), all of which reached #1, plus "I Can't Get Over You" (which made #5) and "South of Santa Fe" (which stalled at #41). This last song was the first (and only) single of Brooks & Dunn's career to miss Top 40 entirely, and was the last single to feature Kix Brooks on lead vocals instead of Ronnie Dunn. The album is a counterpart to Reba McEntire's album If You See Him (released on the same day), which shared the track "If You See Him/If You See Her". A bonus limited edition EP was made available when consumers bought both If You See Him and If You See Her at the same time.  "Born and Raised in Black in White" is a cover of The Highwaymen (aka Waylon Jennings, Willie Nelson, Johnny Cash & Kris Kristofferson) song off their 1990 album, Highwayman 2.

Track listing

Charts

Weekly charts

Year-end charts

Personnel
As listed in liner notes.

All tracks except "If You See Him/If You See Her"
Bruce Bouton – pedal steel guitar, lap steel guitar
Kix Brooks – lead vocals, background vocals
Dennis Burnside – piano, keyboards, Hammond B-3 organ
Mark Casstevens – acoustic guitar
Ronnie Dunn – lead vocals, background vocals
Shannon Forrest – drums
Larry Franklin – fiddle, mandolin
Steve Gibson – acoustic guitar
Rob Hajacos – fiddle, "assorted hoedown tools"
Wes Hightower – background vocals
David Hungate – bass guitar, tic tac bass
John Barlow Jarvis – piano, keyboards, Hammond B-3 organ
Chris Leuzinger – electric guitar
Liana Manis – background vocals
Brent Mason – electric guitar, gut string guitar
John Wesley Ryles – background vocals
Dennis Wilson – background vocals
Lonnie Wilson – drums, percussion
Glenn Worf – bass guitar

The Nashville String Machine
David Angell, David Davidson, Carl Gorodetzky, Lee Larrison, Pamela Sixfin, Alan Umstead, Catherine Umstead, Mary Kathryn Vanosdale – violins
Gary Vanosdale, Kris Wilkinson – violas
John Catchings, Bob Mason – cellos

"If You See Him/If You See Her"
Bobby All – acoustic guitar
Bruce C. Bouton – pedal steel guitar
Larry Byrom – electric guitar
Kix Brooks – background vocals
Mark Casstevens – acoustic guitar
Ronnie Dunn – lead vocals
Rob Hajacos – fiddle
John Barlow Jarvis – piano, electric piano
Brent Mason – electric guitar
Randy McCormick – synthesizer
Reba McEntire – lead vocals
Michael Rhodes – bass guitar
John Wesley Ryles – background vocals
Lonnie Wilson – drums

References

1998 albums
Brooks & Dunn albums
Arista Records albums
Albums produced by Don Cook